Mia M. Bloom is a Canadian academic, author, and Professor of Communication at Georgia State University. She was formerly an associate Professor of International Studies at the Pennsylvania State University in University Park and a fellow at the International Center for the Study of Terrorism at Penn State.

Bloom received a PhD in political science from Columbia University, a Master's in Arab Studies from Georgetown University and a Bachelor's from McGill University in Russian, Islamic studies and Middle East Studies. Her studies specialize in ethnic conflict, rape in war, child soldiers, female terrorists, and terrorist communications. Bloom was a term member of the Council on Foreign Relations in 2003–2008. Bloom has also taught and researched at numerous universities. She has appeared on CNN, PBS Newshour,  MSNBC, and Fox News.

Books
 Dying to Kill: The Allure of Suicide Terror (Columbia University Press, 2005)
 Living Together After Ethnic Killing: Exploring the Chaim Kaufman Argument (edited with Roy Licklider, Routledge, 2007)
 Bombshell: Women and Terror (University of Pennsylvania Press, 2011)

Notes

References

1968 births
Living people
University of Georgia faculty
The American University in Cairo alumni
Rutgers University faculty
Cornell University faculty
University of Massachusetts Lowell faculty
Princeton University staff
Harvard University staff
Georgetown University Graduate School of Arts and Sciences alumni
McGill University alumni
Columbia Graduate School of Arts and Sciences alumni
Tel Aviv University alumni
Canadian expatriates in the United States